Phytoecia vulneris is a species of beetle in the family Cerambycidae. It was described by Per Olof Christopher Aurivillius in 1923.

Subspecies
 Phytoecia vulneris vulneris Aurivillius, 1923
 Phytoecia vulneris eremita Sama, 1999

References

Phytoecia
Beetles described in 1923